Attilanus (Atilanus) (937–1007) was an Aragonese Benedictine and bishop of Zamora. He was prior of Moreruela Abbey.

He was canonized in or about the year 1095.

Notes

External links
Benedictine Saints

937 births
1007 deaths
Spanish Benedictines
Bishops of Zamora
Medieval Spanish saints
People from Tarazona y el Moncayo
10th-century bishops in al-Andalus
11th-century bishops in al-Andalus
11th-century Christian saints